Swithland Sidings is a set of railway sidings on the preserved Great Central Railway, situated just south of Swithland Reservoir and Swithland Viaduct which crosses it.

Commercial history
The original plans for the MS&LR's London Extension had a station situated at Swithland instead of Rothley, although Rothley was much the larger village of the two, and only slightly further from the line. Local pressure, much of it spearheaded by Frederick Merttens, Lord of Rothley Manor, forced a change in the plans and the proposed site changed to Rothley; however, this did not mean that Swithland station was abandoned. The railway company had visions of turning the area into a tourist spot and the construction of Swithland station was commenced anyway. It would have consisted of an island platform of the standard design that became typical of the line, here the less common "embankment" type reached from a roadway (the Swithland-Rothley road) that passed beneath the line, similar to East Leake. In the event, these plans were thwarted, reportedly at a fairly advanced stage, and work stopped. Since it was barely a mile away to the south, Rothley station was deemed adequate to serve the area.

It has been difficult to determine just how much of Swithland station was actually built. The bricked up station entrance below and between the twin bridges over the Swithland-Rothley road can still be seen to this day; one of the many excellent photographs taken by the Leicester photographer S.W.A. Newton of the line's construction clearly shows the view looking up the stairway towards the platform. The mystery surrounds the platform itself - several sources appear to confirm that the platform was completed, together with at least some of the buildings, but it has so far not been possible to substantiate this for certain. What is known is that anything that was built lasted only a short time, though the main running lines continued to veer round the platform's site throughout the operating history of the line. 

Sidings were however sited here to serve the Mountsorrel Railway, a mineral branch leading to granite quarries in the village of Mountsorrel about two miles to the north east; this line was originally closed on 6 April 1964 but has since been reconstructed.

Preservation
 

The main line through here was closed on 5 May 1969. The trackbed was subsequently taken over for preservation, but in 1990 the sidings were wasteland. Led by the vision of GCR benefactor David Clarke, the nephew of a former signalman on the GW&GC Joint Line, double track was relaid from Swithland to Rothley, and then from Swithland to Quorn, eventually reaching Loughborough in 2000. Swithland thus forms the centrepiece of the double track, with GWR signalling as used on the GW&GC Joint Line.  The signal box is the former Aylesbury South box which was located at Aylesbury railway station. The station was once again considered, but it was then decided that it would be close enough to Rothley not to be needed.

All the sidings, the Mountsorrel Branch and the second main line had gone. So what you now see is what members of the Great Central Railway have painstakingly put back in what is the largest track and signalling project anywhere in railway preservation. Swithland Sidings now has the Up and Down main lines, Up and Down passing loops, a complex of sidings for the storage of railway vehicles and the re-instated Mountsorrel Branch. It has a re-erected signalbox and is fully signalled with semaphore signals. The signalling became operational in the summer of 2012.

The facilities at Swithland allow for the storage of railway vehicles and the passing loops will allow trains to be held in the loop while an express passes on the main line. Diners will be able to relax while eating their meals while trains pass by on the main lines. It will be possible to see trains coming and going on the branch and joining the main line in a unique display of former railway operations. The Great Central Railway’s famous galas will be enhanced by the facility and will provide experiences of main line steam operation not available anywhere else.

In the Winter 2012 edition of Main Line Magazine (Issue 153), it was announced that RVP had proposed plans for a four road carriage shed at the back of Swithland Sidings. It will mark a great step forward in the storage of carriages and help to clear the Swithland site to give a better prospect from passing trains. It will also help significantly in prolonging the condition of carriages after restoration. The 65 meter long shed will be able to house a total of 12 coaches over the four roads. Planning permission was put in with Charnwood Borough Council in Autumn 2012 and on 4 February 2013 the ambitious plans were given conditional approval. The conditions relate mainly to screening, trees and hedgerows and RVP will be working to meet these conditions before fund raising and building commences. The estimated cost of this superstructure comes out at around the £120,000 mark.

From 26–28 April 2013, the Great Central Railway will be opening Swithland sidings to the public for a gala to celebrate the achievements of all volunteers who have worked on this huge project. This will be the first time in many years that the public will have access to this location.

References 

Great Central Railway
Great Central Railway (preserved)